Grosso may refer to:

 Grosso, Piedmont, comune in the Metropolitan City of Turin in the Italian region Piedmont
 Grosso (footballer), retired Portuguese footballer
 Grosso (surname), an Italian surname
 Grosso (coin), name for a silver coin used in various states of the Holy Roman Empire

See also 

 Grasso
 Grossi